Fernando Picon da Silva, known as Picon (born 6 February 1976) is a Brazilian professional football defender last playing with Ituano Futebol Clube.

Career
Born in São Paulo, he begin his career playing with local giants São Paulo FC. He was part of São Paulo team that won the 1998 Campeonato Paulista. He played one season with XV de Piracicaba in 2001 before moving abroad to play with Super League Greece side Ionikos F.C.

He had a spell in Serbia playing with OFK Beograd in the First League of FR Yugoslavia before returning to Brazil. In 2004, he was playing with Sociedade Imperatriz de Desportos winning with them the state championship in 2005.

After a spell with Rio Preto Esporte Clube in 2006 he will return to Ionikos F.C. in early 2007, however as the club ended up relegated at the end of the 2006-07 season, Picon was loaned to Chinese side Shanghai Stars until the end of the year.

In 2008, he returned to Brazil joining Poços de Caldas, a side that had just been formed a year earlier. Between summer 2008 and 2009 he will play with Esporte Clube Pelotas, before finishing the year with Ituano Futebol Clube.

Honours
São Paulo
Campeonato Paulista: 1998

Imperatriz
Campeonato Maranhense: 2005

Pelotas
Copa FGF: 2008

References

External sources
 
 Profile in Brasildepelotas
 Profile in Blig.ig.com
 Stats in Futpédia.

Living people
1976 births
Footballers from São Paulo
Brazilian footballers
Association football defenders
São Paulo FC players
Esporte Clube XV de Novembro (Piracicaba) players
Ionikos F.C. players
Expatriate footballers in Greece
OFK Beograd players
Expatriate footballers in Serbia and Montenegro
Rio Preto Esporte Clube players
Esporte Clube Pelotas players
Ituano FC players
Brazilian expatriate sportspeople in China
Pudong Zobon players
Expatriate footballers in China